Diu (Chinese: 屌, Hong Kong coinage: 𨳒 [門+小], jyutping: diu2) is a common profanity in Cantonese. It can be regarded as the Cantonese equivalent of the English fuck. Its Mandarin cognate, is also used by young people in Taiwan to mean "cool" (in this context it is not censored on TV broadcasts, but considered as a sub-culture).

In classic Chinese
Diu is a word in the Cantonese language. It appears frequently in the text of the classic novel Water Margin, and is written as 鳥 (meaning "bird", pronounced niǎo in Mandarin and niu5 in Cantonese when used in this usual sense). It is used as an emphatic adjective with a function similar to the English "fucking", "bloody" or "god damned". For example,
Water Margin, Chp. 29
Diu means primarily the penis. It is written as 屌 when used in this sense, but usually as 鳥 when used as an emphatic adjective. For example, 
Romance of the Western Chamber, Act 5, Scene 3
 has its female equivalent 屄 (pronounced bī in Mandarin and hai1 in Cantonese) in the traditional Chinese written language. In the Yuan Dynasty operas, the word, meaning penis, is sometimes written as 頹. For example,
Jiu Fengchen, Act 1

In Hong Kong and Macau
The written form  [+] is mainly seen in Hong Kong, although the younger generation use  for example on graffiti. In Cantonese, it is used as a transitive verb meaning to copulate. In a manner similar to the English word fuck, it is also used to express dismay, disgrace, disapproval and so on. For example, someone may shout "diu nei!" ("fuck you!" or "fuck off!") at somebody when he or she finds that other person annoying.

"Diu Nei Lo Mo!" ("fuck your mother") is a highly offensive profanity in Cantonese when directed against a specific person instead of used as a general exclamation. In contrast to the English phrase "fuck your mother", which indicates that the person being attacked commits sexual acts with his own mother, the Cantonese expression has the implied meaning of "I fuck your mother".

The form  is absent in the Big-5 character set on computers. The Government of Hong Kong has extended Unicode and the Big-5 character set with the Hong Kong Supplementary Character Set (HKSCS), which includes Chinese characters only used in Cantonese, including the Five Great Profanities. The government explained that the reason for these characters being included is to allow for the Hong Kong Police to record criminal suspects' statements.  Consequently, these characters are now also in Unicode.

In Hong Kong Cantonese, yiu, tiu, siu, chiu, biu, and hiu are all minced oaths for diu, as they all rhyme with "iu".

See also
Cantonese profanity
Hong Kong Cantonese

References

Further reading
Robert S. Bauer and Paul K. Benedict (1997). Modern Cantonese Phonology. Berlin and New York: Mouton de Gruyter. . Part of the chapter 3 concerns the "bad" words in Cantonese.
Kingsley Bolton and Christopher Hutton, "Bad boys and bad language: chou hau and the sociolinguistics of swearwords in Hong Kong Cantonese", in Grant Evans and Maria Tam ed. (1997). Hong Kong: the Anthropology of a Chinese Metropolis. Richmond, Surrey: Curzon. .

External links
  廣州話粗口研究網 
 広東語の粗口

Culture of Hong Kong
Cantonese words and phrases
Cantonese profanity